Suriya Dattuyawat (born 13 August 1978) is a Thai weightlifter. He competed in the men's lightweight event at the 2004 Summer Olympics.

References

1978 births
Living people
Suriya Dattuyawat
Suriya Dattuyawat
Weightlifters at the 2004 Summer Olympics
Place of birth missing (living people)
Weightlifters at the 1998 Asian Games
Suriya Dattuyawat
Suriya Dattuyawat
Suriya Dattuyawat